Forq (pronounced "fork") is an American jazz fusion band from New York and Texas.

History
Forq was co-founded by keyboardist Henry Hey and Snarky Puppy member, bassist Michael League.  The original formation of the band included guitarist Adam Rogers, and drummer Jason "JT" Thomas. Hey, a founding  member of the band Rudder, had played a few Rudder shows, sharing the bill with Snarky Puppy before suggesting a collaboration with League, starting with a few live shows in New York City. The group's debut self-titled album was released on Snarky Puppy's label, GroundUP Music, in 2014. Rogers left the group and was replaced by Snarky Puppy guitarist Chris McQueen early in 2015 prior to a tour of Europe. The group's sophomore album, Batch, was issued in June 2015. The group played at Snarky Puppy's GroundUp Festival in February 2017 and released a third album, Threq, in mid-2017. Since the release of Threq, bassist Michael League has been replaced by bassist Kevin Scott.

Discography
Forq (GroundUP Music, 2014)
Batch (GroundUP Music, 2015)
Threq (GroundUP Music, 2017)
Four (Forq, 2019)
Aargau (Newvelle, 2019)

References

American jazz ensembles
Jazz fusion ensembles
Musical groups from Texas
Musical groups from New York (state)
Jazz musicians from Texas
GroundUPmusic artists